Max Th. Eckmann (November 9, 1851 – June 22, 1931) was an American politician from New York.

Life
He was born on November 9, 1851, in Berlin, Kingdom of Prussia, the son of Ezekiel Eckmann (1818–1864) and Caroline (Löwenstein) Eckmann (1816–1882). He attended the Jewish Communal School and the Friedrichswerdersches Gymnasium, both in Berlin. 

He emigrated to the United States in 1874, and settled in New York City. On February 18, 1875, he married Marie Slupecki. He was a "manufacturer of novelties", and was active in community work. He was among the organizers of the Independent Order of B'rith Abraham.

In November 1905, Eckmann was elected, on the Municipal Ownership League ticket with Republican endorsement, to the New York State Assembly (New York Co., 12th D.), defeating the incumbent Democrat Edward Rosenstein. Eckmann was a member of the 129th New York State Legislature in 1906. Rosenstein contested the election of Eckmann, accusing him of fraudulent proceedings, but the contest was rejected by the Assembly Committee on Elections.

On April 7, 1906, during a probe into the alleged frauds during the November 1905 election, Benjamin M. Goldberger admitted that Eckmann's M.O.L. nomination petition was a forgery. On April 9, Eckmann admitted that after some delay in printing the forms, he and five of his children fabricated at home the nomination petition by copying the names from a directory and another candidate's petition, and wrote all the signatures themselves. The trial was held in the Criminal Branch of the New York Supreme Court. Goldberger turned State's evidence and testified in detail to how the petitions were forged. On June 5, Eckmann pleaded guilty to conspiracy, which is a misdemeanor. He was fined $500.

Eckmann died on June 22, 1931, at his home at 460 Grand Street in Manhattan, of a heart attack.

References

1851 births
1931 deaths
People from the Lower East Side
Members of the New York State Assembly
New York (state) politicians convicted of crimes
Politicians from Berlin
Prussian emigrants to the United States